Executive Order 13792, entitled "Review of Designations Under the Antiquities Act," is an executive order issued by US President Donald Trump on April 26, 2017, that directed the Secretary of the Interior to review designations of national monuments made since 1996. The order applies to all new monuments greater than 100,000 acres in size and monuments that were expanded by at least 100,000 acres. Twenty-two land monuments and five marine monuments that were created by the administrations of Bill Clinton, George W. Bush, and Barack Obama were subject to review.

The order required Secretary of the Interior Ryan Zinke to produce an interim report within 45 days that includes a recommendation on the future of Bears Ears National Monument. A final report was due within 120 days. In announcing the order, Trump called the designation of large national monuments "another egregious use of government power."

Purpose and policy
Trump signed the executive order to allow national monument designations to be rescinded or reduce the size of sites as the administration pushes to open up more federal land to drilling, mining and other development.

The Executive Order put forward the following as policy in Section 1:Designations of national monuments under the An Act for the Preservation of American Antiquities (Antiquities Act of 1906), recently recodified at sections 320301 to 320303 of Title 54 of the United States Code (the "Antiquities Act" or "Act"), have a substantial impact on the management of Federal lands and the use and enjoyment of neighboring lands.  Such designations are a means of stewarding America's natural resources, protecting America's natural beauty, and preserving America's historic places.  Monument designations that result from a lack of public outreach and proper coordination with State, tribal, and local officials and other relevant stakeholders may also create barriers to achieving energy independence, restrict public access to and use of Federal lands, burden State, tribal, and local governments, and otherwise curtail economic growth.  Designations should be made in accordance with the requirements and original objectives of the Act and appropriately balance the protection of landmarks, structures, and objects against the appropriate use of Federal lands and the effects on surrounding lands and communities.

Review of National Monument Designations
Trump has indicated that he was eager to change the boundaries of a 1.35-million-acre national monument Obama declared in December 2016, in Utah, Bears Ears National Monument.

The United States Secretary of the Interior (Secretary) shall conduct a review of all Presidential designations or expansions of designations under the Antiquities Act made since January 1, 1996, where the designation covers more than 100,000 acres, where the designation after expansion covers more than 100,000 acres, or where the Secretary determines that the designation or expansion was made without adequate public outreach and coordination with relevant stakeholders, to determine whether each designation or expansion conforms to six policy criteria listed  in section 1 of this order. Those criteria are:(i)    the requirements and original objectives of the [Antiquities] Act, including the Act’s requirement that reservations of land not exceed “the smallest area compatible with the proper care and management of the objects to be protected”;(ii)   whether designated lands are appropriately classified under the Act as “historic landmarks, historic and prehistoric structures, [or] other objects of historic or scientific interest”;(iii)  the effects of a designation on the available uses of designated Federal lands, including consideration of the multiple-use policy of section 102(a)(7) of the Federal Land Policy and Management Act (43 U.S.C. 1701(a)(7)), as well as the effects on the available uses of Federal lands beyond the monument boundaries;(iv)   the effects of a designation on the use and enjoyment of non-Federal lands within or beyond monument boundaries;(v)    concerns of State, tribal, and local governments affected by a designation, including the economic development and fiscal condition of affected States, tribes, and localities;(vi)   the availability of Federal resources to properly manage designated areas; and(vii)  such other factors as the Secretary deems appropriate.

Affected National Monument Designations

On May 5, the Department of Interior announced a public comment period on the review of twenty-two terrestrial national monuments. The Department sought comments for 15 days on Bears Ears National Monument, and 60 days on the other monuments, both beginning on May 11.

Interim report on Bears Ears National Monument
Interior Secretary Ryan Zinke gave the interim report requested in the Executive Order to the White House on June 10, 2017. The Secretary recommended shrinking the boundaries of the Bears Ears National Monument, and encouraged Congress to designate national recreation areas, national conservation areas, and cultural areas to be co-managed with tribal governments. In announcing the report, Zinke shared his conclusion that, "There is no doubt that it is drop-dead gorgeous country and that it merits some degree of protection, but designating a monument that — including state land — encompasses almost 1.5 million-acres where multiple-use management is hindered or prohibited is not the best use of the land and is not in accordance with the intention of the Antiquities Act."

Reception
Gregory Korte of the USA Today asks: "Whether one president can nullify a previous president's proclamation establishing a national monument." Senator Orrin Hatch has been a proponent of rolling back some of the Antiquities Act. "We feel that the public, the people that monuments affect, should be considered and that is why the President is asking for a review of the monuments designated in the last 20 years", Zinke said, adding that he believes the review is "long overdue". "It is untested, as you know, whether the president can do that", Zinke said.

Environmental groups, outdoor outfitters and Native American tribes argue that federal protection is not only better for the environment, but better for the economy in a rural, economically depressed area of Utah.

Following Secretary Zinke's interim report, the tribal nations that co-manage Bears Ears National Monument and environmental organizations threatened a lawsuit should the government shrink the monument. Davis Filfred of the Navajo Nation stated, "We don’t want it to be rescinded. We wanted it left alone. Right now, what I’m hearing is this is only a recommendation. But when they do make that move, we’re ready as a Navajo nation for a lawsuit, and all the other tribal leaders are ready. We have others who are ready for litigation. This is uncalled for." Earthjustice attorney Heidi McIntosh stated, "Make no mistake: Unilaterally shrinking the boundaries of Bears Ears National Monument would not only be a slap in the face to the five sovereign tribes who share sacred ties to this land, it would violate both the Antiquities Act and the separation of powers doctrine." The organization is preparing a lawsuit on the matter.

Subsequent actions 
On December 4, 2017, President Donald Trump reduced the sizes of Bears Ears and Grand Staircase–Escalante National Monuments, removing protections on about 2.8 million acres of land where mining could resume. Three lawsuits challenged the legality of this action in federal court. On June 5, 2020, Trump signed a proclamation purporting to lift the restrictions on commercial fishing at Northeast Canyons and Seamounts Marine National Monument but without modifying the boundaries. In October 2021 President Joe Biden reversed the three changes.

See also
 List of executive actions by Donald Trump

References

External links 
 Full text of Executive Order 13792 on WikiSource
 Notice of Public Comment on terrestrial monuments issued by Department of Interior.
 Interim Report on Bears Ears National Monument, issued June 10, 2017.

2017 in American law
Environmental policy in the United States
Executive orders of Donald Trump